Wrichik Majumder (born 11 November 1979) is an Indian former cricketer. He played fifteen first-class matches for Bengal between 1998 and 2001.

See also
 List of Bengal cricketers

References

External links
 

1979 births
Living people
Indian cricketers
Bengal cricketers
Cricketers from Kolkata